Andrés Felipe Rivera Galeano (born October 28, 1994) known professionally as Andy Rivera is a Colombian urbano singer. He is the son of popular Colombian singer Jhonny Rivera.

Career 
Andrés Felipe Rivera Galeano was born in Pereira, Colombia. He is the son of Colombian singer Jhonny Rivera and Luz Galeano. He started following his musical career with his dad at the age of 12, in his free time he dedicated himself to vocalization and playing the piano.

His dad wanted him to lead a singing career but instead, he chose to be a reggaeton artist. His first song was supported by his friend Pipe Calderon and his producer Dj Cano and made the song "En Busca Con Ella".

He started getting national fame with his hit "Te Pintaron Pajaritos" alongside Yandar & Yostin, which surpassed 17 million views on YouTube. He then had success in countries like Argentina, Chile, Spain, Ecuador, Venezuela, Peru, and of course his home country Colombia.

Thanks to his success with the song "Te Pintaron Pajaritos" he released the song "Por Todo Me Peleas" but did not get as much success as the song before. He then made a remix with Riko "El Monumental", He kept continuing his career by releasing more songs to get more fame, He released a song called "Si Me Necesitas" but also did not get much success from it, But when he made a remix of the song "Si Me Necesitas" with the popular Puerto Rican duo Baby Rasta & Gringo it had become a success.

He then made a great leap in his career when he realized two separate songs with very popular Puerto Rican reggaeton artists Nicky Jam and Dalmata, The song "Los Perros se Enamoran" with Nicky Jam was popular and some parts of Colombia but the most successful one "Espina de Rosa" With Dalmata was very successful gaining over 100 million views on YouTube. The song "Espina de Rosa" was so popular, that it was number 1 in many Spanish speaking countries.

In 2014, he was a featured artist in a popular song called "Salgamos" alongside Kevin Roldan and Maluma.

In 2020, he won several awards at Latino Show Awards 2020, including Best Popular Music Song, Song of the Year and Best Urban Artist. He was also nominated for several awards at Premios Nuestra Tierra, but did not win any.

Discography

Albums 

 2016: The New Age
 2017: Substance EP
 2019: 50/50
 2022: DUAL EP

Collaborations 
 Dejemos Todo Atrás (Ft. Valeria Celis)
 Te Pintaron Pajaritos (Ft. Yandar & Yostin)
 No Es Normal (Ft. Dayme & El High & Justin Quiles)
 Miénteme (Remix) (Ft. Fontta & Fullbeta)
 Por Todo Me Peleas (remix) (Ft. Riko "El Monumental")
 Si Me Necesitas (remix) (Ft. Baby Rasta & Gringo)
 Los Perros Se Enamoran (Ft. Nicky Jam)
 Los Perros Se Enamoran (remix) (Ft. Nicky Jam, Kevin Roldán, Jowell & Randy, Kafu Banton, Gotay & Ronald El Killa)
 Duele Saber (Ft. Yelsid)
 Hagamos El Amor (Remix) (Ft. Los del Pentagono)
 Espina De Rosa (Ft. Dalmata)
 Salgamos (Ft. Kevin Roldán & Maluma)
 El Que la Hace la Paga (Ft. Johnny Rivera)
 Mañana (Ft. Karol G) 
 Dime (Ft. Karol G)
 Ya No Eres (Ft. Andrew) 
 No Hay Razón Para Odiarte (Remix) (Ft. Yelsid & Dario Gómez)
 La Máscara (Ft. Ale Mendoza)
 Stripper (Ft. Noriel)
llego la hora (Ft. Mario Hart)

Awards and nominations

References 

1994 births
21st-century Colombian male singers
Colombian reggaeton musicians
Living people
People from Pereira, Colombia
Latin trap musicians